Mycobacterium canariasense is a rapidly growing, non-pigmented mycobacterium first isolated from blood samples obtained from 17 patients with febrile syndrome. Etymology: canariasense; referring to the Latin adjective of the Spanish
islands where all strains were isolated.

Description
Microscopy
Weakly acid-fast rods.

Colony characteristics
Visible growth appears in 2–3 days as smooth, moist, shiny, non-pigmented colonies on Löwenstein-Jensen medium.  Growth later develops a more yellowish, smooth, moist and shiny appearance.

Physiology
Growth occurs at 30 and 37C, but not at 22, 42 or 45C.
Grows on MacConkey agar without crystal violet, but does not grow in the presence
of 5% NaCl.
Positive for arylsulfatase activity (3 days) and Tween 80 hydrolysis.
Produces a low level of heatstable catalase and is negative for reduction of nitrates.

Differential characteristics
The 16S rRNA and hsp65 gene sequences of M. canariasense are unique.
Most closely related to Mycobacterium diernhoferi and Mycobacterium mucogenicum.

Pathogenesis
First isolated from blood samples obtained from 17 patients with febrile syndrome in the Canary Islands.

Type strain
Strain 502329T =CIP 107998T =CCUG 47953T

References

Jimenez M.,S., 2004. Mycobacterium canariasense sp. nov. Int. J. Syst. Evol. Microbiol., 54, 1729–1734.

External links
Type strain of Mycobacterium canariasense at BacDive -  the Bacterial Diversity Metadatabase

Acid-fast bacilli
canariasense
Bacteria described in 2004